Topinkatti is a village with approx. 5000 population, their native language is Marathi and Kannada. Topinakatti is split in Kannada as Topina (of the barrel or cannon or even a plant grove) and Katti (a compound), which means the compound of cannon (barrel gun) used in olden times or grove of vegetation. Most peoples are in Indian army and this village having school facility till 10th. This village has gram panchayat serving with other two villages. It's located 10 km away from Khanapur and 26 km away from Belgaum, in Belgaum district of Karnataka, India.

References

Villages in Belagavi district